My Name Is Puck (Swedish: Puck heter jag) is a 1951 Swedish comedy film directed by Schamyl Bauman and starring Sickan Carlsson, Karl-Arne Holmsten and Naima Wifstrand. It was shot at the Centrumateljéerna Studios in Stockholm. The film's sets were designed by the art director Bibi Lindström.

Cast
 Sickan Carlsson as 	Puck Andersson
 Karl-Arne Holmsten as 	Roger Lindman
 Naima Wifstrand as 	Agneta Lindman
 Marianne Löfgren as 	Louise Haglund
 Anne-Margrethe Björlin as 	Elsa Ringschiöld
 John Botvid as Fredrik Göransson
 Jan Molander as 	Dr. Stellan Nilsson-Brosk
 Povel Ramel as 	Malte Jonsson
 Harriet Andersson as 	Dockie
 Hilma Barcklind	as	Mrs. Ringschiöld 
 Josua Bengtson as 	Morbror Orvar 
 Gösta Cederlund as 	Karl-Gustaf Ringschiöld 
 Mona Geijer-Falkner as 	Fru Göransson
 Inga Hodell	as	Fru Strömberg 
 Sven Holmberg as 	Police Constable 
 Ludde Juberg as 	Jansson 
 Aurore Palmgren as 	Lotten the Maid
 Olav Riégo as 	Art Dealer
 Ulla-Carin Rydén as 	Märta
 Bellan Roos as 	Miss Johansson 
 Rune Stylander as 	Doctor 
 Agda Helin as 	Woman in Tobacco Store

References

Bibliography 
 Per Olov Qvist & Peter von Bagh. Guide to the Cinema of Sweden and Finland. Greenwood Publishing Group, 2000.

External links 
 

1951 films
1951 comedy films
Swedish comedy films
1950s Swedish-language films
Films directed by Schamyl Bauman
1950s Swedish films